Doheny State Beach is a protected beach in the state park system of California, United States, located on the Pacific Ocean in the city of Dana Point.  The beach is a popular surf spot located at the mouth of San Juan Creek, which flows from the Santa Ana Mountains southwest to the beach, where it forms a fresh-water lagoon.

History
The beach was donated by oil tycoon Edward L. Doheny for public use on May 31, 1931. It was California's first state beach. On July 1, 1963 the beach was named Doheny State Beach in his honor. An additional  was later added by acquisitions from the Santa Fe Railroad, University of California Regents, and the Union Oil Company. An additional  not owned by the state are included in the site's official total area.

In October 2022, the California Coastal Commission approved a desalination plant on Doheny State Beach capable of producing 5 to 15 million gallons of fresh water per day.

Amenities

Recreational uses
The beach is one of California's most popular camping grounds and attracts over 850,000 people per year. The beach has tide pools and a visitor center with several aquariums.

Animal and plant life
The beach is home to several types of marine life, such as abalone, anemone, several types of sea bass, crabs, the common dolphin, harbor seal, kelp, California moray, sea urchin, octopus, stingrays, several varieties of sharks (including the Great White), as well as many other marine life. Several types of birds also live at the beach such as brown pelican, great blue heron, snowy egret, and several other species.

Educational program
Doheny State Beach offers year-round interpretive education programs in marine life, bird life, animal life, water quality, insects, and Native American studies.

References in popular culture
The beach is mentioned in several surf rock songs including the Beach Boys songs "Surfin' Safari" and "Surfin' U.S.A." In "Surfer Joe" by the Surfaris, Doheny Beach is the favorite hangout of the song's protagonist. Jan & Dean's "Dead Man's Curve" also mentions Doheny, but that refers to Doheny Drive, which intersects Sunset Boulevard near the west end of the Sunset Strip in West Hollywood.

Gallery

See also
List of beaches in California
List of California state parks
List of California State Beaches

References

External links
Doheny State Beach
Doheny State Beach Interpretive Association
 Aerial Video of Doheny State Beach and nearby Dana Point Marina - 1080P - Sept 2015

1931 establishments in California
Beaches of Southern California
California State Beaches
Campgrounds in California
Parks in Orange County, California
Protected areas established in 1931
Surfing locations in California
Beaches of Orange County, California